Proteoteras willingana, the eastern boxelder twig borer moth, is a moth of the family Tortricidae. It is found in southern Canada and the eastern United States, west through the Great Plains.

The wingspan is 15–25 mm. Adults are grey mottled with wings with a white to pale brown-fuscous ground colour overlaid with streaks, rings, and clusters of yellowish-tan to black scales. Adults are on wing from late June to late July in Canada.

The larvae feed on Acer negundo and possibly other Acer species. Young larvae feed along the veins or midribs, usually on the lower leaf surfaces. They construct shelters of webbing and frass. Third instar larvae move to the base of petioles and bore into dormant leaf buds. The species overwinters in its fourth instar stage within a silken cocoon within a dormant leaf bud. After winter, the larvae leaves their shelter and burrows into another bud. A single larva destroys two to three buds during the fourth instar. Fifth instar larvae bore into the new stem growth of twigs and terminals and feed within the swollen or galled shoots. When fully grown, the larvae drop to the ground and construct pupation cells in the humus layer of the soil.

References

Moths described in 1904
Eucosmini